muvee Reveal is proprietary video editing software program for Microsoft Windows created by Singapore-based muvee Technologies. Reveal creates video slideshows from input videos, photos, and music. Muvee Reveal 7 was first released in 2007 and is the modern successor to the award-winning muvee autoProducer title first released by muvee Technologies in 2002.  Since 2009, versions of muvee's Reveal movie making software use CUDA for faster processing and rendering.

muvee Reveal has been downloaded over a million times while OEM versions of the software were installed on over 24 million on HP computers, Dell PC and Notebooks, bundled with Nikon One and Coolpix, Flip, Olympus, Sony Cybershot and Panasonic Lumix cameras, Seagate FreeAgent and Toshiba Canvio external hard drives , Coby camcorders since 2004.

Features
Partial List of Features in muvee Reveal:
 Insert photos and video
 Add opening Titles, intertitles, and end Credits with free fonts
 Place captions and subtitle lower-thirds on photos and videos.
 Add any music and mark desired sections
 Fit video to music length
 Add an editing template Style which adds effects, transitions and pacing information
 Voice-over with music-voice-sfx mixer
 magicMoments for Video to mark up essential segments of video
 magicSpot for Photos to mark start and end points for a Ken-Burns effect on photos
 Chapters: create sections where different music and Styles can be used

Output formats
Output formats include:
 WMV
 MOV
 MPEG-1
 DV-AVI
 AVI
 MPEG-2
 H.264
 MPEG-4

See also
 List of video editing software
 Comparison of video editing software
MPEG-4 Part 14

References

External links
 

Video editing software